Wilson is an Amtrak train station in Wilson, North Carolina, United States. It is located in downtown Wilson and is part of the Wilson Central Business-Tobacco Warehouse Historic District.

History
The station was originally built in 1924 by the Atlantic Coast Line Railroad, designed by architect A.M. Griffin, and contained a separate REA Express building. The city bought both buildings from CSX in 1994 and it was restored to its original condition between 1996 and 1998. The REA Express building was converted into a police substation.

Services
The facility is open daily at 9:00am-5:00pm, which includes the ticket office, passenger assistance, baggage service and the waiting area.

Located cater-cornered from the station is the Wilson Transportation Center, providing local and intercity bus services.

Through Thruway Motorcoach buses, the station also serves a large swath of eastern North Carolina. One route serves Greenville, New Bern, Havelock, and Morehead City; another serves Goldsboro, Kinston, Jacksonville, and Wilmington.

References

External links 
 

Wilson Station – NC By Train
Wilson Amtrak Station (USA Rail Guide – Train Web)

Wilson, North Carolina
Amtrak stations in North Carolina
W
Buildings and structures in Wilson County, North Carolina
Transportation in Wilson County, North Carolina
Historic district contributing properties in North Carolina
National Register of Historic Places in Wilson County, North Carolina
Railway stations on the National Register of Historic Places in North Carolina
1924 establishments in North Carolina
Railway stations in the United States opened in 1924
Amtrak Thruway Motorcoach stations in North Carolina